Air Marshal Sir Gerald Ernest Gibbs,  (3 September 1896 – 13 October 1992) was a senior commander in the Royal Air Force in the first half of the 20th century and the last RAF commander-in-chief of the Indian Air Force.

He was educated at Kingston Grammar School, Surrey. During the First World War he scored 10 victories (all in the S.E.5 biplane), becoming a double ace. He retired to Harare, Zimbabwe, in 1984.

References

 Air of Authority – A History of RAF Organisation – Air Mshl Sir Gerald Gibbs
 Bharat-rakshak.com – Air Marshal Sir Gerald Ernest Gibbs
 Harare Obituaries

1896 births
1992 deaths
Chevaliers of the Légion d'honneur
Companions of the Order of the Indian Empire
Knights Commander of the Order of the British Empire
People educated at Kingston Grammar School
People from South Norwood
Recipients of the Croix de Guerre 1914–1918 (France)
Recipients of the Military Cross
Royal Air Force air marshals
Royal Air Force personnel of World War II
Royal Flying Corps officers
British Army personnel of World War I
British emigrants to Zimbabwe
Military personnel from Surrey
Wiltshire Regiment officers
Chiefs of Air Staff (India)